Langenes may refer to the following places in Norway:

Langenes, Agder, a village in Kristiansand municipality, Agder county
Langenes, Finnmark, a village in Alta municipality in Troms og Finnmark county
Langenes, Nordland, a former municipality in Nordland county
Langenes, Vestland, a village in Kinn municipality, Vestland county
Langenes Church, a church in Øksnes municipality, Nordland county

See also
Langnes (disambiguation)
Langeness or Langeneß